Malik Aueskhanuly Oskenbay (Málik Áýeshanuly Óskenbaı; born February 22, 1966, Panfilov, Taldykorgan region (now town Zharkent, Almaty region)) is an artist, sculptor, the head of the subject-cyclic commission of the specialties "Painting, sculpture, theater arts" in Almaty College of Decorative and Applied Arts, and a member of the Union of Artists of Kazakhstan.

Aueskhanuly is the author of many articles and textbooks, including the first human anatomy book in the Kazakh language. He also wrote the program of sculpture training for colleges of art that was approved by the Ministry of Education and Science of the Republic of Kazakhstan. For outstanding achievements in the education of children, the Ministry of Education and Science of the Republic of Kazakhstan awarded him the badge "Y.Altynsarin".

Biography 

 February 22, 1966 was born in Panfilov, Taldykorgan region and then moved to Almaty.
 From 1973 to 1981 he graduated from Secondary School No.115.
 In 1981-1985 he graduated from the Almaty Art School named after N.V. Gogol. High education.
 In 1985-1987, he served in the ranks of the Soviet Army of the Komi ASSR.
 From 1985 to 1992 he graduated from Almaty State Theater and Art Institute named after T. Zhurgenov.
 Since 1992 he has been a special discipline teacher of the Almaty College of Decorative and Applied Arts named after Tansykbayev.
 From 1993 to 2005 he taught subjects like anatomy, sculpture and painting at the Kazakh National Academy of Arts named after Zhurgenov.
 In the years 2001-2005, he graduated from the postgraduate course of the Kazakh National Academy of Arts named after Zhurgenov.
 Since 2005  he has been Head of the Department of "Painting, Sculpture, Decorative Theater Art" in the Almaty College of Decorative and Applied Arts named after O.Tansykbayev.

Creations 

 Awarded the gold medal named after Abilkhan Kasteev for "Best Creativity of the Year" in the nomination of sculpture at the annual exhibition of artists of Kazakhstan in 2019, organized by KRSO, certificate №198.
10.05 in 2017 was awarded the breastplate "Excellence in the Culture" of the Ministry of Culture and Sports of the Republic of Kazakhstan (No. 246-к);
 16.09. in 2008, No. 01826, was awarded with the badge "Y. Altynsarin" for the significant contribution to the education and upbringing of the younger generation of the Ministry of Education and Science of the Republic of Kazakhstan;
 Welcome letter of the Ministry of Education and Science of the Republic of Kazakhstan;

Exhibitions 

 2019. "Annual Report Exhibition of Artists of Kazakhstan";
 2018. "Exhibition dedicated to the 85th anniversary of the Union of Artists of the Republic of Kazakhstan"
 2017. Solo creative exhibition "Plastic Search", dedicated to the 25th anniversary of Independence of the Republic of Kazakhstan;
 2016. Round table dedicated to the author's personal art exhibition "Plastic Search";
 2016. "Exhibition dedicated to the 25th anniversary of Independence of the Republic of Kazakhstan" organized by the Republican Union of Artists of Kazakhstan;
 2015. "Exhibition dedicated to the 550th anniversary of the Kazakh Khanate" organized by the Republican Union of Artists of Kazakhstan;

 National Museum of the Republic of Kazakhstan "National Traditions and Openness to the World". 2014. "At the bottom of the Sea", sculpture, material: black granite, 30 x13 x11.
 An exhibition dedicated to the 80th anniversary of the Union of Artists of the Republic of Kazakhstan. 2013. "December severe cold", sculpture, material: marble, granite (75 pages).
 "Sculptural monumental or decorative art". 2013. "Freedom", sculpture, material: bronze, granite.
 "Golden Cradle of Kazakh Fine Arts". Collection of exhibitions dedicated to the 75th anniversary of Almaty College of Decorative and Applied Arts named after Tansykbayev. 2013. p. 173. "Melody", sculpture, material: granite; "Ambition", sculpture, material: granite, 2013.
 "Almaty College of Decorative and Applied Arts named after Oral Tansykbayev". 2012. p.64. "Khan" sculpture, material: wood; "Nomadic", sculpture, material: bronze, granite; "Student Girl", sculpture, material: bronze, granite (p. 46).
 "Almaty College of Decorative and Applied Arts named after Ural Tansykbayev". 2010. p. "Sacrifice", sculpture, material: granite; "Shaman" sculpture, material: bronze, granite, (p. 32).
 "Exhibition of teachers of the Almaty College of Decorative and Applied Arts named after Ural Tansykbayev". 2009. 43 p. "Baksy", sculpture, material: bronze, granite, "Meditation", sculpture, material: bronze, granite (p. 27).
 Republic exhibition "... today, tomorrow...". 2009. "Saka Daughter", sculpture, material: bronze, granite; "Shaman" sculpture, material: bronze, granite, (p. 67).
 "Art of Kazakhstan for centuries". "Sitting girl". Sculpture, material: granite; size: 20 x 30 x 13. 1999. (Page 26).
 2007 - "Reporting Exhibition of the Union of National Artists";
 Exhibition-competition "My Kazakhstan" devoted to the 100th anniversary of the People's Artist Abylkhan Kasteyev in 2005: creative sculpture "Ablai Khan", material: wood;
 In 2004 the republican exhibition "Zhas Daryn": sculpture "Syrlasu"; material: granite, stone, wood;
 2000 International Youth Festival Exhibition: "Mother's Kindness"; material: burnt ceramic;
 In 2001, the International Festival "Tulips and Man" was held: "Girl with tulips" graphics;
 In 1999, the International Youth Festival, the exhibition "Sitting Hero"; material: terracotta;
 In 1998 there was a personal exhibition "Cultural Center in Turkey", sculptures: "The Great Steppe Miss", material: tree, "Echo", material: wood, "Baluan", material: tree, "December", material: wood, "Lovers", material: stone;
 In 1997 the international youth festival "Zhiger", "Sagynysh", material: wood;
 In 1996, International exhibition "Kisen ashgan", "December", material: relief wood sculpture;
 In 1995 "Art Eurasia" international exhibition "Victims of repression" material: wood;

Scientific works

Published scientific publications 

 The author of the book "Sketches are the basis of fine arts". 2020. 
The author of the book "The manifestation of a Man's head Image". 2018.
 "Fine arts, music and drawing" at the school, Republican scientific-methodical magazine No. 5-6, 2016. An article titled "Creating a drawing technique." Pgs. 30-32.
 "The Legend of Man" magazine No. 15 (99) August 2014. Publication interview "The genius artist (1452-1519) Leonardo da Vinci, the pride of humanity".
 International Scientific and Practical Conference: "Continuous Art Education in the Republic of Kazakhstan: Decorative Applied Art - 2012", an article titled: "Features of the formation of the sculpture of ancient Kazakhstan" - 301-303 pages
 He is the author of the book "Plastic anatomy". 2006.
 Year 2005. International scientific-practical conference «Actual problems of art development in modern conditions of globalization», organized by KazNU named after Zhurgenov, theme of the article: «Ancientization of ancient Kazakhstani sculptural forms»;
 Year 2005. International scientific-practical Conference dedicated to "The 100th anniversary of Oral Tansykbayev ", theme:" Volume and Spatial Analysis "," The Effect of Composition on the Composition and Sculpture ";
 Year 2005. Anitov K., a student of the 2nd year student scientifically-practical conference, dedicated to the birthday of academician Oral Tansykbayev, held on May 25–26, under the title "The enlightened if you are a bearer". Head of the article "Sculpture of the First Society, Ancient East and Ancient Sculpture": Oskenbay M.A.;
 Year 2005. The author of a set of typical curriculums in the disciplines of sculpture, composition, skill, is devoted to sculpture department, excluded in the Kazakh and Russian languages from the printing house;
 Year 2005. The author of the Model Study Program on the subject "Plastic anatomy". Was excluded from the printing house in the Kazakh and Russian languages;
 In 2005 co-author of 1 volume of the book, "Chronicle of Kazakhs and Its Kings and Khans".
 In 2002, International Scientific and Practical Conference "Culture-Art-Education: Trends and Prospects", organized by KazNMU named after Zhurgenov.
 Year 2004. International scientific-practical conference "Cultural heritage and national education system of Kazakhstan people", organized by KazNMU named after Zhurgenov.
 Year 2003. International scientific-practical conference "National model of education: methodology and modern technology of vocational training", organized by KazNU named after Zhurgenov.

References

External links 
Youtube Channel
The artist is in the stream of the time
 New direction and artistic search of modern Kazakh visual arts (video)
 Roundtable: "Modern Kazakh Fine Arts"
 Culture portal
 The hero of the program is Malik Oskenbay, sculptor.

1966 births
Living people
Kazakhstani painters
Kazakhstani sculptors